David Teymur (born May 1, 1989) is a  Swedish professional mixed martial artist who competes in the lightweight division of the Ultimate Fighting Championship.

Kickboxing and Muay Thai career
David and his older brother Daniel started out doing Muay Thai as youths, David started in 2004 at the age of 15, they had grown up watching their older brother Gabriel competing in kickboxing and boxing.

David had a decorated amateur career, at the highest point when he won a bronze medal at the IFMA World Championship A-class in Bangkok, Thailand in 2009. He also won the Nordic Championship once (muay thai) and the Swedish national Championship three times (twice in muay thai, once in kickboxing).

He also competed professionally, where he completed a record of 39–2, with 11 wins by KO/TKO. He won the 2011 King of the Ring tournament in Oldenzaal, the Netherlands.

Mixed martial arts career

Early career
Still competing in kickboxing and muay thai at the time, David and his brother Daniel Teymur started to train MMA in 2012–2013.

David made his MMA debut on October 19, 2013 at International Ring Fight Arena 5, where he lost by decision against Mattias Rosenlind.

He rebounded from the loss as he had his next two fights in the same promotion, defeating Veselin Dukov by unanimous decision on April 5, 2014 and on November 22, 2014 he defeated Gaik Pogosyan by a first-round TKO due to knees.

On April 4, 2015 he fought Robin Tuomi at Trophy MMA 6. Teymur won the fight by TKO due to leg kicks and punches in the first round.

The Ultimate Fighter
In August, 2015 it was announced that Teymur was selected for The Ultimate Fighter: Team McGregor vs. Team Faber.

To get into the TUF house, he defeated Thibault Gouti by unanimous decision.

In the elimination round he fought Johnny Nuñez. Teymur dropped Nunez with knees to the body early and with a left hook late in the fight. He won the fight by unanimous decision.

In the quarter finals he fought Marcin Wrzosek. He lost by majority decision.

Ultimate Fighting Championship
Teymur made his UFC debut against TUF teammate and fellow Swedish fighter Martin Svensson on February 27, 2016 at UFC Fight Night 84. He won the fight by TKO after he knocked Svensson down with an uppercut in the second round.

His next fight was against Jason Novelli on August 6, 2016 at UFC Fight Night 92. Teymur scored a knockdown from a straight left hand in round 1. In round 2 he scored two knockdowns, first by another straight left and moments later he won the fight by knockout after dropping Novelli to the canvas by a right-left hook combination.

In his third fight with the promotion Teymur took on highly touted Lando Vannata on March 4, 2017 in the co-main event at UFC 209. Despite coming in as a 3-1 underdog, Teymur got the upset and won the fight by unanimous decision. The fight was awarded Fight of the Night honors.

Teymur next fought undefeated Drakkar Klose on December 2, 2017 at UFC 218. He won the fight by unanimous decision.

Teymur was expected to face promotional newcomer Don Madge on May 27, 2018 at UFC Fight Night 130. However, Madge pulled out of the fight in late April with an undisclosed injury. As a result, Teymur was removed from the card entirely and rescheduled to face Nik Lentz the following week at UFC Fight Night 131. He won the fight by unanimous decision.

Teymur faced Charles Oliveira on February 2, 2019 at UFC Fight Night 144. He lost the fight via an anaconda choke submission in the second round.

Personal life
Teymur's older brother, Daniel Teymur, is also a MMA fighter who was previously signed with the UFC. Both brothers transitioned to MMA from kickboxing and Muay Thai in 2012, making their debuts in 2013. A few years later both got into the UFC. David was signed in 2015 and Daniel in 2017. He is of Aramean descent.

Championships and accomplishments

Mixed martial arts
Ultimate Fighting Championship
Fight of the Night (One time) 
Nordic MMA Awards - MMAviking.com
2017 Fighter of the Year

Kickboxing and Muay Thai
Professional
2011 K-1 ‘’King of the Ring’’ (Holland) tournament winner
Amateur
IFMA
2009 IFMA World Cup A-class Tournament (Bornze medal) (-67 kg)
Regional championships
2008 Swedish National Muay Thai Championship  - (gold medal)(-63,5 kg)
2009 Swedish National Muay Thai Championship - (silver medal) (silver medal) (-67 kg)
2009 Nordic Muay Thai Championship - (gold medal) (-67 kg)
Gold medal - 2010 Swedish National Muay Thai Championship (-67 kg)
2012 Swedish National Kickboxing Championship  - (gold medal) (-71 kg)

Mixed martial arts record

|-
|Loss
|align=center|8–2
|Charles Oliveira
|Submission (anaconda choke)
|UFC Fight Night: Assunção vs. Moraes 2
|
|align=center|2
|align=center|0:55
|Fortaleza, Brazil 
|
|- 
|Win
|align=center|8–1
|Nik Lentz
|Decision (unanimous)
|UFC Fight Night: Rivera vs. Moraes
|
|align=center|3
|align=center|5:00
|Utica, New York, United States
|
|-
|Win
|align=center|7–1
|Drakkar Klose
|Decision (unanimous)
|UFC 218 
|
|align=center|3
|align=center|5:00
|Detroit, Michigan, United States
|
|-
|Win
|align=center| 6–1
|Lando Vannata
|Decision (unanimous)
|UFC 209
|
|align=center|3
|align=center|5:00
|Las Vegas, Nevada, United States
|
|-
|Win
|align=center| 5–1
|Jason Novelli
|KO (punches)
|UFC Fight Night: Rodríguez vs. Caceres
|
|align=center|2
|align=center|1:25
|Salt Lake City, Utah, United States
|
|-
|Win
|align=center| 4–1
|Martin Svensson
|TKO (punches)
|UFC Fight Night: Silva vs. Bisping
|
|align=center|2
|align=center|1:26
|London, England
|
|-
| Win
|align="center" | 3–1
| Robin Tuomi
| TKO (leg kicks and punches)
| Trophy MMA 6
| 
|align="center" | 1
|align="center" | N/A
| Malmö, Sweden
| 
|-
| Win
|align="center" | 2–1
| Gaik Pogosyan
| TKO (knees)
| International Ring Fight Arena 7
| 
|align="center" | 1
|align="center" | 2:57
| Solna, Sweden
| 
|-
| Win
|align="center" | 1–1
| Veselin Dukov
| Decision (unanimous)
| International Ring Fight Arena 6
| 
|align="center" | 3
|align="center" | 5:00
| Solna, Sweden
|
|-
| Loss
|align="center" | 0–1
| Mattias Rosenlind
| Decision (unanimous)
| International Ring Fight Arena 5
| 
|align="center" | 3
|align="center" | 5:00
| Solna, Sweden
|

Mixed martial arts exhibition record

|-
|Loss
|align=center| 2–1
| Marcin Wrzosek
| Decision (majority)
| The Ultimate Fighter: Team McGregor vs. Team Faber
| (airdate)
|align=center|2
|align=center|5:00
|Las Vegas, Nevada, United States
|
|-
|Win
|align=center| 2–0
| Johnny Nuñez
| Decision (unanimous)
| The Ultimate Fighter: Team McGregor vs. Team Faber
| (airdate)
|align=center|3
|align=center|5:00
|Las Vegas, Nevada, United States
|
|-
|Win
|align=center| 1–0
| Thibault Gouti
| Decision (unanimous)
| The Ultimate Fighter: Team McGregor vs. Team Faber
| (airdate)
|align=center|2
|align=center|5:00
|Las Vegas, Nevada, United States
|

See also
 List of current UFC fighters
 List of male mixed martial artists

References

External links

1989 births
Living people
Lightweight mixed martial artists
Mixed martial artists utilizing Muay Thai
Swedish male mixed martial artists
Swedish male kickboxers
Swedish Muay Thai practitioners
Sportspeople from Stockholm
Swedish people of Assyrian/Syriac descent
Ultimate Fighting Championship male fighters
Assyrian sportspeople